Barjora College, established in 1985, is the general degree college in Barjora, Bankura district, West Bengal, India. It offers undergraduate courses in arts. It is affiliated to  Bankura University.

History
Barjora College was established in 1985 to provide higher education in northern Bankura district. Many distinguished personalities of this area and the common people donated the land for this college. This college was initially started in Barjora High School; later it was shifted to its permanent building in 1987.

Departments

Arts
Bengali(Hons)
English(Hons)
History (Hons)
Political Science (Hons)
Philosophy (Hons)
Sanskrit (Hons)
Geography (Hons)
Economics

Accreditation
In 2016 the college has been awarded B grade by the National Assessment and Accreditation Council (NAAC). The college is recognized by the University Grants Commission (UGC).

See also

References

External links 
 

Universities and colleges in Bankura district
Colleges affiliated to Bankura University
Educational institutions established in 1985
1985 establishments in West Bengal